Catephia iridocosma is a species of moth of the  family Erebidae. It is found in São Tomé & Principe (Principe) and Uganda.

References

Catephia
Moths described in 1911
Moths of Africa